Samuel Hood, 2nd Baron Bridport (7 September 1788 – 6 January 1868), of Redlynch House in Wiltshire, of Cricket House at Cricket St Thomas in Somerset, and of 12 Wimpole Street in Westminster, was a British politician and peer.

Family background
He was born in 1788, the second son of Henry Hood, 2nd Viscount Hood (1753–1836), Chamberlain of the Household to Queen Caroline, by his wife Jane Whe(e)ler (c.1754–1847). She was daughter and heiress of Francis Whe(e)ler of Whitley Hall near Coventry in Warwickshire, by his wife Jane Smith, a daughter of the banker Abel Smith I (1686–1756) of Nottingham: a son of Thomas Smith (1631–1699), the founder of Smith's Bank in Nottingham and father of Sir George Smith, 1st Baronet (1713–1769) "of East Stoke in the County of Nottingham" and of Abel Smith II (1717–1788), MP. Members of the Wheeler and Hood families were buried in St Michael's Church in Coventry.

Education and political career
He was educated at Trinity College, Cambridge, obtaining an M.A. degree in 1809. He was returned as a Tory Member of Parliament for Heytesbury, Wiltshire in 1812, although he appears to have lost interest in Parliament after succeeding to the peerage and did not stand for re-election in 1818.

Succeeded as Baron Bridport
In 1814, soon after the death in action of his elder brother, he succeeded his childless great-uncle Admiral Alexander Hood, 1st Viscount Bridport, 1st Baron Bridport (1726–1814) as Baron Bridport, under the special remainder of that title in the Peerage of Ireland.

Personal life

On 3 July 1810 in the parish of Marylebone, London, Hood married Charlotte Mary Nelson (1787–1873), suo jure 3rd Duchess of Bronte in Sicily (an Italian title), only surviving child and heiress of the Rev. William Nelson, 1st Earl Nelson, 2nd Duke of Bronte (1757–1835). He was Rector of Brandon Parva and later of Hilborough, both in Norfolk, from 1814 seated at Trafalgar Park, Downton in Wiltshire and at nearby Redlynch House in Wiltshire.

Through his wife he inherited the Castello di Nelson, a grand manor house built by Horatio Nelson, and its large estate between Bronte and Maniace in Sicily on the north-west foothills of Mount Etna, held by his descendants until 1982. He found the local inhabitants "turbulent, restless people" troublesome to the management of the estate, and like his brother the Admiral he never set foot in it.

Hood died on 6 January 1868.

By his wife he had two sons and five daughters. He was succeeded by his eldest son, Alexander (1814–1904) who was later Viscount Bridport and Duke of Bronte.

References

External links

1788 births
1868 deaths
Alumni of Trinity College, Cambridge
Members of the Parliament of the United Kingdom for English constituencies
Samuel
Younger sons of viscounts
Barons in the Peerage of Ireland
Tory MPs (pre-1834)
UK MPs 1812–1818
Bridport, B2